A bench is a long seat on which multiple people may sit at the same time. Benches are typically made of wood, but may also be made of metal, stone, or other synthetic materials. Many benches have back rests, while others do not and can be sat on from either side. Arm rests are another common feature. In many American public areas, benches are often donated by persons or associations, which may then be indicated on it, e.g. by a small plaque. This is a common form of memorial to somebody who has died (see memorial bench). Benches can be both outdoors and indoors, but they are more commonly found outdoors.

Types

Often, benches are simply named for the place they are used, regardless of whether this implies a specific design.
 Park benches are set as seating places within public parks, and vary in the number of people they can seat.
 Garden benches are similar to public park benches, but are longer and offer more sitting places.
 Picnic tables, or catering buffet tables, have benches as well as a table. These tables may have table legs which are collapsible, in order to expedite transport and storage.
 Scenic benches are situated to provide a more comfortable means of enjoying the contemplation of a beautiful landscape, a busy street scene, or less commonly a specific event.
 Perch benches are usually situated in high traffic areas to enable people to take a quick break. 
 A storage bench is a combination of sitting space and a storage box, often used for keeping gardening supplies or grill equipment.
 A form is a backless bench that was used for seating in dining rooms, school rooms and law courts — can be leather or upholstered fabric with or without a back rest.
 Wooden benches in early railway passenger cars

Various types of benches are specifically designed for and/or named after specific uses, such as:
 Leaning benches, or "leaners", have been installed by some cities for people to rest against in public areas where there is no room for regular benches.
 Church benches and pews inside places of worship, which are sometimes equipped with an additional kneeling bench. Church benches and pews can come in various styles including traditional, modern and curved to match and complement the architectural styles and spaces of places of worship.
 a bench seat is a traditional seat installed in automobiles, featuring a continuous pad running the full width of the cabin.
 a punishment bench is used to have a punishee lie (and often be tied) down on for the administration of a corporal punishment, after which it may be specifically named, e.g. caning bench
 a bench (weight training) is used for fitness exercises, such as the bench press which is named after its use of a bench
 a communion bench is not used as a seat
 a piano bench usually offers one person seating
 a spanking bench, such as a caning bench, is specifically designed for a spankee to lie upon, possibly strapped down, while submitting to paining of the posterior
 swing seats are independently movable, suspended benches, used for play or as a relaxing porch swing.
 Glider Benches are similar to Swing Seats but are not suspended; instead they have a mechanism under the seating area that allows the bench to rock back and forward
 a courting bench (or kissing bench, or tête-à-tête): a two-seater with the seats pointing in opposite directions, thus almost facing each other.
 a buddy bench (or friendship bench) in a school playground is where a child can go when they want someone to talk to.
 the bench in a courtroom, behind which the judge is seated.

Construction materials
Benches come in a variety of different materials, but there are some venue standards that account for use, durability, and maintenance patterns.
 Adobe: (banco) type benches are made of packed earth often combined with a binder, such as straw. They are found throughout the world in countries that use earth or mud construction techniques, in both outdoor and indoor settings. 
 Aluminum: Aluminum benches are often found in outdoor, sideline settings at recreational venues like sports fields or courts and as a complement to bleacher systems. The material affords for a lightweight, corrosive-free bench, so it is a portable and economical option for indoor or outdoor settings. 
Cast iron: early outdoor benches were made of cast iron, Among the earliest in America were produced by the iron foundry Janes, Beebe & Co in the mid-19th century. 
 Concrete: Concrete benches are very heavy and are a more permanent furnishing. They are often installed in facilities that are not expected to change or transition often, if at all, such as military bases, state parks and official buildings. Concrete is very durable, so it is appropriate for any climate. Concrete can be composed of many different materials to afford benches different accents, depending on what it is composed of.
 Fiberglass: Fiberglass is a versatile material so fiberglass benches can come in a variety of designs and finishes or colors. The material is great for indoor or outdoor use because it will not corrode or rust, is very low maintenance, and can be manufactured to complement any facility. Common places where fiberglass benches are installed include food courts, restaurants, and office buildings. 
 Powder-coated steel: Powder coated steel benches are often found lining entryways for different venues, like retail centers, medical facilities and country clubs. While powder-coat is a common finish on many commercial site furnishings, it is often featured on strap metal benches because of its anti-corrosive qualities and ability to strongly bond to heavy duty steel constructions. Powder-coated benches also come in a variety of colors and designs, from classic strap metal benches to extremely intricate designs.
 Recycled plastic: Recycled plastic benches are low maintenance, available in a variety of colors and styles, and are appropriate for any environment, including typically-corrosive salty, ocean side facilities. Recycled plastic components can vary based on the manufacturer, but it is commonplace that a high percentage is post-consumer material and will contribute to LEED certification. For these reasons, they are commonly found at a wide range of venues, including convention centers, office buildings, universities, retail centers, schools and stadiums. 
 Thermoplastic: Thermoplastic is an environmentally friendly coating for metal benches. Thermoplastic benches are very commonplace, located in facilities ranging from schools, parks, recreational spaces and office buildings. The material itself is graffiti resistant and easily repairable, as opposed to other metal coatings and, with a thorough coat, will help a metal bench withstand a variety of climates. There are endless color options and six different common pattern styles: expanded metal, perforated metal, strap style, welded wire, diamond pattern and rod style. Expanded metal is often seen in casual park settings, featuring a lattice-like look while strap style can be commonly featured trail side or embellishing a sidewalk.
 Wood: Wood benches are a very high maintenance option because they need to be regularly treated with an insect repellent or coated with polyurethane or similar coating to maximize the life of the material. They are typically found along walking trails and state parks, while high-quality wood products like teak, redwood and mahogany are commonly found in residential furniture lines, resorts and restaurant settings. Other common lumber furnishing materials include oak and southern yellow pine.

Usage 

There are a number of ways to use a bench. Standard usage involves sitting on the seat facing a direction perpendicular to the long axis of the bench. If there is a backrest, this direction must be away from the backrest. Some others include:

 Raised position. Here, one sits on the backrest (which must be present). 
 Supine position. 
 Daydream position. Here, one lies down on the ground and props their feet up on the seat. 
 Lowered position. Here, one sits on the ground and leans their back against the seat.
 Reverse position. Here, one sits on the seat facing the side containing the backrest (which must be present). 
 Side position. Here, one sits on the seat facing parallel to the long axis of the bench. One's legs are on opposite sides of the bench. This usage is more common on benches without a backrest.

Gallery

See also
 Bench Around the Lake, an artwork by Jeppe Hein at the Indianapolis Museum of Art
 Buddy bench
 Camden bench
 Furniture
 Pew
 Prie-dieu

References

External link

 
Furniture
Garden features
Street furniture
Seats